The 1976 Senior League World Series took place from August 17–21 in Gary, Indiana, United States. Pingtung, Taiwan defeated Aiea, Hawaii twice in the championship game. It was Taiwan's fifth straight championship.

Teams

Results

References

Senior League World Series
Senior League World Series
Baseball competitions in Indiana
Sports in Gary, Indiana
1976 in sports in Indiana